Pukaqucha (Quechua puka red, qucha lake, "red lake", Hispanicized spelling Pucacocha) is a mountain in the Andes of Peru, about  high, at a small lake of the same name. The mountain is located in the Junín Region, Yauli Province, in the districts of Marcapomacocha and Morococha, and in the Lima Region, Huarochirí Province, Chicla District. It lies near the Antikuna pass, northwest of Yuraqqucha and northeast of Inka Kancha and Sillaqaqa.

The little lake named Pukaqucha is situated west of the mountain.

References

Mountains of Peru
Mountains of Lima Region
Mountains of Junín Region
Lakes of Peru
Lakes of Junín Region